Euphaedra zampa, the green orange forester, is a butterfly in the family Nymphalidae. It is found in Sierra Leone, Liberia, Ivory Coast and Ghana. The habitat consists of primary wet forests.

Adults are attracted to fruit.

Similar species
Other members of the Euphaedra eleus species group q.v.

References

Butterflies described in 1850
zampa